Sorian People's Platform (PPSO) is a Sorian regionalist political party founded in 2011 by ex-members of the provincial branch of the People's Party (PP). The party merged with Citizens (C's) in 2015, but stood as a separate party in the 2019 Spanish general election coming sixth in Soria with 2656 votes (5%).

Election results

Local councils

References

Centrist parties in Spain
Political parties in Castile and León
Regionalist parties in Spain
Political parties established in 2011
2011 establishments in Spain